George Syrimis (15 October 1921 – 5 January 2010) was a Cypriot accountant, who served as the Finance Minister of Cyprus from 1988 to 1993. Syrimis was also the founder of the accounting firm, G. Syrimis & Co., which eventually evolved into KPMG Cyprus (a Big Four).

Early life

Syrimis was born in Nicosia, Cyprus. However, his family was originally from Agros, a village in the island's southern Pitsilia region. Syrimis studied accounting in England, where he became a chartered certified accountant. Then president George Vassiliou appointed Syrimis as the country's Finance Minister in 1988. He continued to serve as finance minister within the Vassiliou government until 1993.

KPMG Cyprus

He returned to his native Cyprus from the UK in 1948. Syrimis founded his own accounting firm, G. Syrimis & Co.  His firm later became part of Peat Marwick, which, in turn, was merged to become KPMG International in 1987. In 1961, Syrimis became a founding member of the Association of Certified Public Accountants of Cyprus (ICPAC), later serving as chair of the professional organization.

Philanthropy 

Syrimis was heavily involved in Cypriot charities and philanthropic organizations. An art collector, he sold his pieces to benefit local organizations, including the Cypriot National Guard. He was a member of the Rotary Club of Nicosia, the oldest rotary club in Cyprus.

Death

Syrimis died on 5 January 2010, at the age of 88. He was survived by four children – Olympia Stylianou, the director general of the Cypriot Ministry of Education; Nicos Syrimis, the chairman of the Association of Certified Public Accounts of Cyprus since June 2009; Michalis Syrimis and Marios Syrimis.

References

1921 births
2010 deaths
Cypriot accountants
Cyprus Ministers of Finance
People from Nicosia